Sarkent State Nature Park is a national park in Leylek District of Batken Region of Kyrgyzstan established in June 2009. The purpose of the park is conservation of the unique natural complexes and biodiversity, protection of rare and endangered flora and fauna, and extension of network of specially protected areas of Kyrgyz Republic. The area of the park is 39,999 hectares. The park is located in the Turkestan Range, 42 km from the district center Isfana and in 177 km from the regional center Batken.

Rare species listed in the Red Book live here, such as the brown bear, the snow leopard, the golden eagle, the lynx, and the saker. The park is located on the very edge of Kyrgyzstan, making visitor levels low. Local authorities are trying to further develop tourism in the area.

Hydrology
The hydrology of the park area in dominated by Ak-Suu (Syr Darya) river that flows into Syr Darya, and its tributaries. There are five lakes in the nature park including Aykol (located at the altitude of approximately 3,000 meters), Jashylkol, Sutkol, Boyrokkol, and Jashkol.

Fauna
Surveys of the mammals inhabiting the park conducted in 2009-2016 showed occurrence of the following species.

References

Protected areas established in 2009
National parks of Kyrgyzstan